George William Morton (July 5, 1793 – May 7, 1865) was an American politician who served as the Clerk of the Court for the United States District Court for the Southern District of New York under Judge Samuel Betts. He was the third Mayor of Hoboken, New Jersey from 1858 to 1859.

Biography
He was born on July 5, 1793 in Manhattan, New York City to Jacob Morton and Catherine Ludlow. He later married Caroline Augusta Denning.

Morton served as the first Treasurer of Hoboken, New Jersey being elected in the 1855 Charter election. He was appointed as a Water Commissioner in 1857. Morton was the Democratic nominee for mayor in 1858. He served a single term and was defeated by his predecessor in the 1859 election.

Morton was the Clerk of the Court for the United States District Court for the Southern District of New York under Judge Samuel Betts.

He died on May 7, 1865 in Hoboken, New Jersey.

References

1865 deaths
Mayors of Hoboken, New Jersey
1793 births
19th-century American politicians